Big Girl is the second studio album by Nigerian R&B singer Seyi Shay. It was released on 10 December 2021, by Stargurl Limited. It was produced by Bruno Spiritual-Vibes, Kel-P, Dr. Amir, and GuiltyBeatz. The album was executive produced by Stargurl Limited (founder. Seyi Shay), and Jones Worldwide (co-founders. Shay Jones, & Wiz Jones), alongside co-executive producer Kel-P.

The album was dedicated to Edith Olabisi Joshua and Sound Sultan, and features BackRoad Gee, Calema, Shay Jones, Simi, Wande Coal, and Yemi Alade. Motolani Alakehe described the project elements as Afro-swing, R&B, Afro-pop, and Caribbean pop.

Background
In January 2021, she signed a publishing deal with Universal Music Publishing Group division in France, with a partnership deal between Universal Music France, and Aristokrat Publishing, a division of Aristokrat Records, and a subsidiary of The Aristokrat Group. Shortly after the six edition of the Nigerian Idol, she began working on Big Girl, with Jones Worldwide. On June 9, 2021, Seyi Shay and Yemi Alade performed a live version of "Pempe" on Clout Studio.

Singles
On 7 May 2021, she released the lead single of the album, "Pempe", featuring Yemi Alade, accompanied by a music video, released on 10 May 2021, and directed by Clarence Peters. The record peaked at 35 on TurnTable Top 50 chart.

Critical reception

Big Girl received generally favorable reviews from music critics. In a review for ModernGhana, Agwuma Kingsley wrote "Big Girl is Seyi Shay being innovative, being versatile as well as cherry-picking the right set of creators to accompany her current state of mind. The harmony of Big Girl is undeniable as much as the album sequencing, cohesiveness, proper record production, and the songwriting in particular". Reviewing for Pulse Nigeria, the music journalist Motolani Alake described the album and its title as a "self-explanatory title as her features elevated her music. It was nice to see her collaborate with her fellow female stars. But Calema and Shay Jones stand out from the bunch", and in conclusion, Motolani Alakehe said "the album suffers from a lack of obvious singles. Upon completion, ‘Pempe’ was clearly not the best single for the album. ‘Glowanna’ could be a single, but it would need an aggressive promo. ‘Big Girl’ isn’t the greatest song, but it has strong TikTok potential".

Track listing

Personnel
List of credits from Big Girl
Deborah Oluwaseyi Joshua – vocals, songwriting, executive producer
Jones Worldwide - executive producer
Shay Jones - vocals, songwriting 
Wiz Jones
Kel-P – co-executive producer, production 
PD - production 
Bruno Spiritual-Vibes - production 
Dr. Amir  – production 
GuiltyBeatz – production 
Dro – mixing, mastering

Release history

References

2021 albums
Seyi Shay albums
Albums produced by GuiltyBeatz
Yoruba-language albums